Victoria High School is a secondary school in the town of Sreemangal, Moulvibazar District, Bangladesh. It was established in 1924 under British rule. The school was managed by an executive committee under the supervision of the education ministry.

References

High schools in Bangladesh
Educational institutions established in 1924
1924 establishments in India
Schools in Moulvibazar District
Srimangal Upazila